The Krag Mountains are a mountain range on northern Baffin Island, Nunavut, Canada. It is part of a much larger mountain range called the Baffin Mountains which in turn form part of the Arctic Cordillera mountain system.

See also
List of mountain ranges

References

Arctic Cordillera
Mountain ranges of Baffin Island